Wasing Wood Ponds is a  biological Site of Special Scientific Interest south of Aldermaston in Berkshire.

The ponds are special for their range of Odonata.

Geography

The site is a group of ponds, wet ditches and marshy areas partly in the Woods and partly on open ground formerly excavated for gravel.

It is in two different areas, which are private land, but a public footpath crosses one of them.

Fauna

The site has the following animals

Invertebrates

Cordulia aenea
Brilliant emerald
Sympetrum sanguineum
Erythromma najas

Flora

The site has the following Flora:

Trees

Birch

References

Sites of Special Scientific Interest in Berkshire
Wasing